Tapirus polkensis, the pygmy tapir, is a small prehistoric tapir that lived in North America during the late Miocene and early Pliocene. T. polkensis may have lived in swamps, where it would have been preyed on by ancestors of modern American crocodiles.

The Gray Fossil Site in northeast Tennessee is home to the world's largest known fossil assemblage of T. polkensis.

References

Prehistoric tapirs
Neogene mammals of North America
Miocene odd-toed ungulates
Pliocene odd-toed ungulates
Fossil taxa described in 1860